is a Japanese actress. She is also a former gravure idol and made her debut in 1998.

Early life
Sato was born in Sapporo, Hokkaido, and raised in Tokyo.

Career
Sato starred in Hideaki Anno's 2004 comedy film Cutie Honey and Koji Shiraishi's 2007 horror film Carved.

She has also appeared in films such as Daihachi Yoshida's 2007 black comedy film Funuke Show Some Love, You Losers!, Kazuya Konaka's 2010 science fiction film Nanase Futatabi and Junji Sakamoto's 2010 mystery film Strangers in the City.

She co-starred in Tsuyoshi Inoue's 2010 drama film The Town's Children with Mirai Moriyama.

Filmography

Film
 Samurai Girl 21 (2002)
 Cutie Honey (2004)
 Japan Sinks (2006)
 Silver Season (2007)
 Carved (2007)
 Funuke Show Some Love, You Losers! (2007)
 Aki Fukaki (2008)
 The Setting Sun (2009)
 Goemon (2009)
 All to the Sea (2010)
 Nanase Futatabi (2010)
 Strangers in the City (2010)
 The Town's Children (2010)
 Night People (2013)
 R100 (2013)
 Ringside Story (2017)
 Laplace's Witch (2018)
 Diner (2019)
 Fancy (2020)
 Midnight Swan (2020)
 Kisaragi Station (2022)
 Break in the Clouds (2022), Ageha

Television
 Chura-san (2001)
 Lunch no Joō (2002)
 Kaidan Hyaku Monogatari (2002)
 Orange Days (2004)
 Tokyo Wankei (2004)
 Densha Otoko (2005)
 Koi ni Ochitara (2005)
 Densha Otoko DX: Saigo no Seizen (2006)
 CA to Oyobi! (2006)
 Shin Ningen Kosaten (2006)
 Sengoku Jietai: Sekigahara no Tatakai (2006)
 Tenka Souran: Tokugawa Sandai no Inbo (2006)
 Kikujiro to Saki (2007)
 Yamato Nadeshiko Shichi Henge (2010)
 Welcome to the El-Palacio (2011)
 Koi Suru Nihongo (2012)
 Boys on the Run (2012)
 Last Hope (2013)
 Magical x Heroine MagimajoPures (2018)
 Hanbun, Aoi (2018)

Awards
2008: Yokohama Film Festival - Best Actress

References

External links
 Official website
 

1981 births
Living people
Japanese gravure models
People from Sapporo
People from Tokyo
Japanese film actresses
Japanese television actresses
Japanese television personalities